A single mother also referred to as a “single mom” is an unmarried female aka single parent who has little to no support from the child/children’s father. In most cases the father is completely removed from her and the child’s life by choice or necessity and he provides minimal financial support by choice. Single moms are mothers who are not in relationships and the biological father is typically absent from the day to day functions and responsibilities of the child’s upbringing. If the child’s father has 50/50 custody or visitation, if the woman is an unmarried mother and not in a committed relationship, she falls under the category of “single woman” not single mom. A single mom typically provides over 50% of the costs to raise and care for the dependent and can typically be considered head of household on taxes and can claim the child when filing. 

Single Mother or Single Mothers may also refer to:

Single Mother (film), a 1928 German silent film (German:Ledige Mütter)
Single Mothers (album), a 2014 album by Justin Townes Earle
Single Mothers (band), a Canadian punk rock band